Outwitted is a 1925 American silent melodrama film, written and directed by J. P. McGowan. It stars Helen Holmes, William Desmond, and J. P. McGowan, and was released on January 21, 1925.

Cast
 Helen Holmes as Helen Kinney
 William Desmond as Jack Blaisdel
 J. P. McGowan as Tiger McGuire
 Grace Cunard as Lucy Carlisle
 Alec B. Francis as John Kinney
 Emily Fitzroy as Meg

References

External links 
 
 
 

Films directed by J. P. McGowan
American silent feature films
American black-and-white films
Melodrama films
Silent American drama films
1925 drama films
1925 films
1920s English-language films
1920s American films